Mirabel station is a commuter rail station in Mirabel, Quebec, Canada, which is served by Exo's Saint-Jérôme line. The station opened on January 4, 2021.

The station is located in Saint-Janvier on the city's east side. The City of Mirabel, Exo and Union des producteurs agricoles went on a lengthy negotiation to purchase land for the station.

In December 2017, the project was given the go-ahead for preliminary plans, with a construction start due in early 2019. The station was expected to open by the end of 2020, but it was postponed as construction site was closed for COVID-19. The station features a 300-metre-long platform, 333 parking spaces, the "kiss and ride" passenger drop-off facility, and a bus loop with three bus platforms. The remaining landscape and paving work are expected to be completed by Summer 2021.

References

External links

Exo commuter rail stations
Mirabel, Quebec
Railway stations in Canada opened in 2021